The 1919 Kentucky gubernatorial election was held on November 4, 1919. Republican nominee Edwin P. Morrow defeated Democratic incumbent James D. Black with 53.82% of the vote.

General election

Candidates
Major party candidates
Edwin P. Morrow, Republican 
James D. Black, Democratic

Other candidates
G. D. Becker, Socialist

Results

References

1919
Kentucky
1919 Kentucky elections